The Bang is a South African indie pop band from Johannesburg, South Africa. The band presently consists of Joshua Gregg (Vocals, Guitar, Mandolin, Kazoo); Gad de Combes (Keyboards, Accordion, Melodica, Harmonica, Backing Vocals); Stefan Lawrence (Drums, Percussion); Barry Sherman (Bass, Backing Vocals)

History
The Bang was formed in 1999 by lead vocalist/guitarist Joshua Gregg and bassist Barry Sherman. The band went through various line-ups, including drummer Danny Girnun, who played drums on the band’s E.P. Of Engines And Earthworms, recorded at Ian Osrin’s Digital Cupboard in November 2001, under the band-name 3Speed

In 2003, local producer Adrian Levi (brother of music video director, Daniel Levi), heard the E.P., and promptly signed the band to his indie label Chameleon Records South Africa (home of the South African band, Max Normal)

The Bang’s debut full-length album, Shiny was recorded over 2004 and 2005, and was released in September 2005.

As of April 2010 band members Joshua Gregg and Brad Kallenbach left The Bang to form the new group Cold War Candy Drop. The new group has a faster more upbeat feel to it according to Joshua.

Discography

Albums
 Shiny (2005) Chameleon Records South Africa

EPs
 Of Engines and Earthworms (2001) Self-financed

Singles
 "Shiny" (2005)
 "Johnny's In Love With You" (2006)
 "Benny Butler" (2006)
 "Talk To The Trees" (Radio Edit) (2007)

Trivia and song appearances
Their song "Benny Butler," from the album Shiny is included on the soundtrack to EA Sports’ Rugby 08
"Ballad Of The Lemon Man" is on the Soundtrack to Footskating 101

External links
Joe Blog Article
Isolation Article
The Muso Reviews Shiny

Indie pop groups
South African alternative rock groups